Nicholas I. Klomp is an Australian academic administrator. Since February 2019, he has served as vice-chancellor and president of Central Queensland University.

Education 
Klomp holds a Bachelor of Applied Science degree from Curtin University, First Class Honours from Murdoch University and a PhD in Environmental Science from the University of Glasgow.

Career 
Prior to his appointment as vice-chancellor, Klomp was the deputy Vice-Chancellor (Academic) at the University of Canberra and prior to that role, Klomp was the dean of the Faculty of Science at Charles Sturt University.

In addition to his extensive teaching career, Klomp was a science correspondent for ABC radio for over 10 years and has produced two books and over 60 refereed publications.

Klomp sits on the Regional Universities Australia Vice-Chancellor's group and has openly voiced his passion on the importance of regional education in Australia

References

External links 
Inaugural Address by Prof Nick Klomp 
Opinion piece
Technology careers thrust for Rockhampton

Living people
Heads of universities in Australia
Curtin University alumni
Australian university and college faculty deans
Murdoch University alumni
Alumni of the University of Glasgow
Australian expatriates in the United Kingdom
Academic staff of Charles Sturt University
Academic staff of the University of Canberra
Academic staff of Central Queensland University
Year of birth missing (living people)